Broadway is an NJ Transit train station served by the Bergen County Line located in Fair Lawn, in Bergen County, New Jersey, United States. It is one of two NJ Transit train stations in Fair Lawn, the other being Radburn. The station is located on an overpass above Route 4, which is known as Broadway in Elmwood Park and Fair Lawn.

History
Originally known as a passenger stop called Warren Point, the elevated Broadway station dates to 1934 when Route 4 was built between Paterson and the George Washington Bridge.

The station recently underwent an upgrade where most of its signage and its shelter was replaced; in addition signs were installed at the corner of Broadway and East 55th Street and on the wall abutting the stairway to the Suffern-bound platform identifying the station as "Broadway Fair Lawn".

Station layout
The station has two tracks, each with a low-level side platform. No parking for the station is available in Fair Lawn. An 80-space permit parking lot is available across Broadway at East 55th Street in Elmwood Park. The station is accessible on foot from Broadway and Rosalie Street, the latter of which dead ends at the Suffern-bound (northbound) platform, and from Broadway using two separate staircases.  The Hoboken-bound (southbound) platform has a ticket machine and a shelter.

Bibliography

References

External links

 Broadway entrance from Google Maps Street View

Fair Lawn, New Jersey
Railway stations in Bergen County, New Jersey
NJ Transit Rail Operations stations
Former Erie Railroad stations
1881 establishments in New Jersey
Railway stations in the United States opened in 1881